Jon Snodgrass is a musician and member of the groups Armchair Martian, Scorpios, and Drag the River. He also performs solo and has collaborated with other musicians, including Tim McIlrath of Rise Against, and Joey Cape of Lagwagon.

Biography
Jon Snodgrass was born and raised in St. Joseph, Missouri, and later settled in Fort Collins, Colorado, before forming Armchair Martian in the early 1990s. In 1996, he started recording songs with ALL singer Chad Price under the name Drag the River. Since then, he has continued putting out music with both bands, as a solo artist, and as a member of Scorpios.

Snodgrass has collaborated with Chad Rex, Hagfish, Descendents, Stephen Egerton, Joey Cape, Lagwagon, Bad Astronaut,
Cory Branan, Frank Turner, Chuck Ragan (Revival Tour and Hot Water Music),
Tim McIlirath (Rise Against), Chris Wollard (Hot Water Music and Ship Thieves), Vinnie Fiorello (Less Than Jake), Scott Reynolds (ALL), Mike Herrera (MxPx), Arliss Nancy, and Jimmy Islip.

Discography
with Armchair Martian
barely passing 7in 1994
Xenophobe single (Cargo/Headhunter) 1995
s/t (Cargo/Headhunter) 1996
Monsters Always Scream (My Records) 1997
Hang On, Ted (Cargo/Headhunter) 1998
War of the Worlds Split with Bad Astronaut (O&O Records) 2001
Who Wants To Play Bass? (My Records) 2002
Good Guys, Bad Band (Suburban Home Records) 2007

with Drag the River
Hobos Demos (Upland/O&O Records) 2000
CLOSED (Upland/O&O Records) 2002
Live at the Starlight (Mars Motors) 2002
At The Green Door LP (Mars Motors) 2003
Chicken Demos (Upland/O&O Records) 2004
hey, buddies (Mars Motors) 2004
a way with women 7in (wallride) 2004
 a shame/beautiful & damned 7in (third world) 2006
It's Crazy (Suburban Home Records) 2006
Gabba Gabba Hey, Buddies 12in (Derok) 2007
Found All the Parts Split w the Dents (Suburban Home Records) 2007
You Can't Live This Way (Suburban Home Records) 2008
Under The Influence Sam Cooke/Jeff Black 7in (Suburban Home Records) 2009
Can't Leave These Strays 7in (Suburban Home Records) 2009
Garage Rock 7in (Suburban Home Records) 2009
Bad at Breaking Up 7in/outta print collection (Suburban Home Records) 2009
Split 7in w/ Ship Thieves (Hometown Caravan) 2009
2010 Demons LP (Hometown Caravan) 2010
Drag the River (Xtra Mile Recordings) 2013

Solo – "Jon Snodgrass & Friends"
 Live at the Hi-Dive 6.12.07 Cassette (Analog Empire) 2008
 Who Wants to Get Down? Split 7in w/ Joey Cape (Suburban Home Records) 2009
Visitor's Band (Suburban Home) 2009
Wolf & Cobra LP & Cassette w/ Cory Branan (Suburban Home) 2009
Buddies 10in w/ Frank Turner (Xtra Mile) 2010
Liverbirds w/ Joey Cape (crank lab) 2010
Tri-State Record 7in (Paper + Plastick) 2011
Five State Record (Hometown Caravan) 2011
More Buddies, More Fun (Paper + Plastick) 2012
1-2-3-4/Perfect Match (Hometown Caravan) 2016
TACE (A-F RECORDS) Oct. 2020
Buddies II: Still Buddies w/ Frank Turner (Xtra Mile) 2020

with Scorpios
s/t LP (self released) 2011 (re-released 2013 Destiny Records, Berlin) / Fat Records
Scorpios Too (One Week Records / Fat Wreck Chords) 2017

References

External links 

 Official website

Living people
Year of birth missing (living people)
Singer-songwriters from Missouri
People from Fort Collins, Colorado
American male singer-songwriters
Scorpios members
Singer-songwriters from Colorado